Alberto Moreno Pérez (born 5 July 1992) is a Spanish professional footballer who plays as a left-back for La Liga club Villarreal.

An academy graduate of local side Sevilla, he made his senior debut for the club's reserve side in 2011 before going on to feature in 62 official games for the first team. During his time with Sevilla, he was part of the squad which won the Europa League title in 2014. The following season, he joined Premier League club Liverpool for a reported fee of £12 million, where he made 141 appearances and collected runners-up medals in the EFL Cup and the Europa League, and a winner's medal in the Champions League.

Moreno was part of the Spain under-21 team that won the 2013 UEFA European Championship and made his senior debut the same year.

Club career

Sevilla

Moreno was born in the Andalusian capital of Seville and at the age of 13 joined local side Sevilla. There he progressed through the club's youth academy and made his senior debut for the reserve side, Sevilla Atlético, on 12 June 2011 in a 3–1 home win over Guadalajara in the Segunda División B play-offs. The club ultimately lost 5–4 on aggregate, however. His first full season followed thereafter during which he scored four goals in 30 games, including his first senior goal directly from a corner kick in added time against Cádiz. Whilst playing for the reserve side, Moreno operated under the tutelage of Ramón Tejada who rotated him between attacking and defensive positions down the left-flank of the field. The positional rotation was later credited for his tactical awareness which contributed to him making his first team, and La Liga debut. This took place on 8 April 2012 when he came on as a substitute for Manu del Moral in the last minutes of a 1–0 away loss against Athletic Bilbao.

In February 2013, Moreno was permanently promoted to the first team and he scored his first professional goal on 20 October, netting the second in a 2–2 draw at Real Valladolid. He ultimately made 17 appearances during a campaign blemished only by a straight red card he received following a confrontation with Gabi in a league match against Atlético Madrid. He enjoyed a breakthrough season in the 2013–14 campaign where he made 44 appearances in total for the club, including 14 in Sevilla's victorious run in the UEFA Europa League. His performances throughout the season also contributed towards Sevilla ending the fifth in the league and earned him a spot in Spain's provisional squad for the 2014 FIFA World Cup.

On 12 August 2014, and on the eve of Sevilla's 2014 UEFA Super Cup match against Real Madrid, Moreno was withdrawn from the club's match-day squad after the club agreed a £12 million deal with Premier League side Liverpool for his signature. Following the match, Moreno was in tears and had to be consoled as he was given a send off by the club's fans. He later explained that he was emotional to be leaving Sevilla as the club was the "club of his life" but that he was equally motivated to succeed at Liverpool.

Liverpool
On 16 August 2014, Moreno officially completed his move to Liverpool and he made his debut for the club 10 days later in a 3–1 league loss to Manchester City. He then scored his first goal on 31 August, netting the third goal in 3–0 away win against Tottenham Hotspur after dispossessing Andros Townsend and sprinting 40 yards to score. He scored again in December, against Swansea City, but ultimately endured an inconsistent debut season at Anfield, with his attacking output not matched by his defensive performances.

Moreno spent the first four games of the next season as a substitute as new teammate Joe Gomez started in his position. However, on 20 September 2015, he made his first league start of the season, providing the assist for Danny Ings' first Liverpool goal in a 1–1 draw against Norwich City, and was praised for his man of the match performance. His performance in the 2016 UEFA Europa League Final, where Liverpool lost 1–3 to his former club Sevilla, was heavily criticised by pundits and journalists for positioning and defensive errors.

On 14 August 2016, Moreno started in the first game of the season, a 4–3 win at Arsenal, where he conceded a penalty and was criticised heavily for his performance, prompting a defence from his manager Jürgen Klopp. Despite his manager's intervention, he was dropped and used only as a late substitute for the next game, an 0–2 loss at Burnley. He made 18 appearances over the season, just eight as a starter, as James Milner was preferred in the left-back slot.

In April 2017, Serie A teams AC Milan and Inter Milan spoke to Liverpool about a transfer for Moreno, and in June the Reds rejected a €12.5 million bid for him from another Italian club, Napoli.

Moreno played more frequently at the start of the 2017–18 season, but was criticised in November in a Champions League group game against Sevilla, in which Liverpool led 3–0 at half time but drew 3–3, and was defended by Klopp. He ultimately lost his position to new signing Andrew Robertson for the rest of the season.

Despite not playing in the 2019 UEFA Champions League Final against Tottenham Hotspur on 1 June 2019, Moreno won his first Champions League winner's medal as Liverpool won 2–0. Three days later, after making just five appearances all season, Moreno was released by Liverpool.

Villarreal
On 9 July 2019, Moreno signed a five-year contract with Villarreal CF. In September 2020, he was ruled out for an estimated six months with a cruciate ligament injury to the left knee.

On 26 May 2021, Moreno won the Europa League Final with Villarreal, scoring a penalty in the tense 11-10 shootout.

International career

Youth
Moreno represented the Spain under-21s at the 2013 UEFA European Championship, being first-choice as he helped them retain their European title. Following the competition's completion he was announced in UEFA's official team of the tournament.

Senior
Moreno was called up to the senior team on 4 October 2013 for the last 2014 FIFA World Cup qualifier against Georgia, and he made his debut on 15 October, playing the full 90 minutes in a 2–0 win in Albacete.

Moreno was included in Vicente del Bosque's 30-man provisional list for the tournament in Brazil, but was one of seven players cut from the final squad.

Over three years since his last cap, Moreno was recalled by Julen Lopetegui for friendlies against Costa Rica and Russia in November 2017.

Personal life
Moreno has many tattoos. In April 2016, he had his leg decorated with an image of a gun-toting chimpanzee dressed in a suit and wearing headphones; ESPN FC's verdict was "Please don't ask, because we haven't got the slightest clue." The back of his leg is decorated with the coordinates of his hometown's Plaza de España. Moreno has two children with his partner Lilia Granadilla.

Career statistics

Club

International

Honours
Sevilla
 UEFA Europa League: 2013–14

Liverpool
 UEFA Champions League: 2018–19; runner-up: 2017–18
 Football League Cup runner-up: 2015–16
 UEFA Europa League runner-up: 2015–16
Villarreal

 UEFA Europa League: 2020–21

Spain U21
 UEFA European Under-21 Championship: 2013

Individual
 UEFA European Under-21 Championship Team of the Tournament: 2013

References

External links

Profile at the Villarreal CF website

1992 births
Living people
Footballers from Seville
Spanish footballers
Association football defenders
Sevilla Atlético players
Sevilla FC players
Villarreal CF players
Liverpool F.C. players
Segunda División B players
La Liga players
Premier League players
UEFA Europa League winning players
UEFA Champions League winning players
Spain under-21 international footballers
Spain international footballers
Spanish expatriate footballers
Spanish expatriate sportspeople in England
Expatriate footballers in England